Persatuan Sepakbola Indonesia Majalengka (simply known as Persima Majalengka) is an Indonesian football club based in Majalengka Regency, West Java. They currently compete in the Liga 3.

References

External links

Majalengka Regency
Sport in West Java
Football clubs in Indonesia
Football clubs in West Java
Association football clubs established in 1960
1960 establishments in Indonesia